The Faliscan language is the extinct Italic language of the ancient Falisci, who lived in Southern Etruria. Together with Latin, it formed the Latino-Faliscan languages group of the Italic languages. It seems probable that the language persisted, being gradually permeated with Latin, until at least 150 BC.

Corpus
An estimated 355 inscriptions survive, mostly short and dating from the 7th to the 2nd centuries BC. Some are written from right to left in a variety of the Old Italic alphabet, derived from the Etruscan alphabet, but they show some traces of the influence of the Latin alphabet. An inscription to Ceres of c. 600 BC, found in Falerii, usually taken to be the oldest example, is written left to right.

A specimen of the language appears written round the edge of a picture on a patera, the genuineness of which is established by the fact that the words were written before the glaze was put on: "foied vino pipafo, cra carefo", in Latin hodie vinum bibam, cras carebo 'today I will drink wine; tomorrow I will not have any.' That sample indicates that Faliscan was less conservative in some respects than Latin, with the wearing down of final case endings and the obscuring of the etymology of foied "today", which is more obvious in Latin hodie (from hoc die).

There are remains found in graves, which belong mainly to the period of Etruscan domination and give ample evidence of material prosperity and refinement. Earlier strata have yielded more primitive remains from the Italic epoch. Many inscriptions with mainly proper names may be regarded as Etruscan rather than Faliscan; they have been disregarded in the account of the dialect just given.

The town of Feronia, in Sardinia, was named probably after their native goddess by Faliscan settlers. A votive inscription from some of them is found at S. Maria di Falleri.

Phonology
Here are some of the phonetic characteristics of the Faliscan language:

The retention of medial f, which Latin changed to b (FHEFHAKED /fefaked/ in the Praeneste fibula may be Proto-Latino-Faliscan);
The palatalization of d followed by consonantal i into some sound, denoted merely by i-, the central sound of foied, from fo-died;
The loss of final s, at least before certain following sounds (cra = Latin cras);
The retention with Latin of the labiovelars (cuando = Latin quando, compare Umbrian pan(n)u);
The assimilation of some final consonants to the initial sound of the next word: pretod de zenatuo sententiad (Conway, lib. cit. 321) = Latin praetor de senatus sententia (zenatuo for senatuos, an archaic genitive).

Problem of f and h 
The question of irregular, unexpected developments of the Proto-Indo-European voiced aspirates in Faliscan, as opposed to the normal Latin rendering, is the appearance of both h and f as reflexes of  *bh/*dh and *gh: filea 'daughter' and hileo 'son' = Latin filius < Proto-Indo-European *dheh₁-lyo- and fe 'here' and hec = Latin hic < Proto-Indo-European *ghey-ke.

In 1991, Rex E. Wallace and B. D. Joseph offered an explanation. They suggested that while it is documented also in Latin, it is the Faliscan material that provides a clearer picture of the supposed developments.

They remark that the unexpected outcomes are absent from the archaic Faliscan inscriptions and that the regular outcomes largely outnumber the irregular ones in the Faliscan epigraphic corpus. The unexpected outcomes show up only in middle and late Faliscan. The following are the only instances:

h for expected f:
hileo (son) Middle Faliscan
hirmia (gentilicium) Middle Faliscan (firmio is also attested)
hirmio (gentilicium) Late Faliscan
holcosio (gentilicium) Late Faliscan
haba 'a kind of bean' < *bhabo- (cited by grammarian Quintus Terentius Scaurus as Faliscan)
f for expected h:
foied 'today' Middle Faliscan < *gho:d d(i)ed
fe 'here' Late Faliscan < *ghey-ke

Wallace and Joseph suppose that the first change is a natural sound change that can be seen in many languages (Spanish hijo 'son' from Latin filium 'son' [accusative]), which in Faliscan affected only a few possible candidate words. The second outcome cannot be explained as a sound change and so they argue it is a hypercorrect form caused by the other development. While the change from f to h was taking place and awareness of the correct forms was being lost, some speakers started restoring f even when it was not etymologically appropriate.

References

Sources

Further reading

Adams, Douglas Q., and James P. Mallory. 1997. "Italic languages." In The encyclopedia of Indo-European culture. Edited by James P. Mallory and Douglas Q. Adams, 314–19. Chicago: Fitzroy Dearborn.
Bakkum, Gabriël C. L. M. 2009. The Latin Dialect of the Ager Faliscus: 150 Years of Scholarship. Part 1. Amsterdam: Amsterdam University Press.
Baldi, Philip. 2002. The foundations of Latin. Berlin: de Gruyter.
Clackson, James, and Geoffrey Horrocks. 2007. The Blackwell history of the Latin language. Malden, MA: Blackwell.
Coleman, Robert. 1986. "The central Italic languages in the period of Roman expansion." Transactions of the Philological Society 84, no. 1: 100–131.
Hadas-Lebel, Jean. La variante falisque. In: La variation linguistique dans les langues de l’Italie préromaine. Lyon : Maison de l'Orient et de la Méditerranée Jean Pouilloux, 2011. pp. 155–168. (Collection de la Maison de l'Orient méditerranéen ancien. Série philologique, 45) [www.persee.fr/doc/mom_0184-1785_2011_act_45_1_2012]
Mercado, Angelo. 2012. Italic Verse: A Study of the Poetic Remains of Old Latin, Faliscan, and Sabellic. Innsbruck: Institut für Sprachen und Literaturen der Universität Innsbruck.
Pulgram, Ernst. 1968. The tongues of Italy: Prehistory and history. New York: Greenwood.
--. 1978. Italic, Latin, Italian, 600 B.C. to A.D. 1260: Texts and commentaries. Heidelberg, West Germany: Winter.
Rigobianco, Luca. "Falisco". In: Palaeohispanica: revista sobre lenguas y culturas de la Hispania antigua n. 20 (2020): pp. 299–333.  DOI: 10.36707/palaeohispanica.v0i20.373

Languages attested from the 7th century BC
Languages extinct in the 2nd century BC
Latino-Faliscan languages
Falisci